Scott Klace (born January 9, 1961) is an American actor. Scott graduated from Westerville North High School in June 1979. He has appeared in over 100 films, television series, and cartoons.

Early television and film appearances 
During his first years of acting behind the main characters, he was often credited under his surname Scott M. Kloes. His professional career began  in the television film The 10 Million Dollar Getaway (1991) as John Murray. Over the next eight years, Scott appeared in several other television series, such as Beverly Hills, 90210 (1996), Seinfeld (1998) and 3rd Rock from the Sun (1998), as well as a few films, including Money for Nothing (1993), Heavy Gear (1997), and Roommates (1995). His most notable appearance came in the final episode of Seinfeld, where he played the jailer of the four main characters.

More recent work 
Scott began using the phonetic spelling of Klace in 1999 when he played Dremk in an episode of Star Trek: Voyager, and Fox in the film Wishmaster 2: Evil Never Dies. He then went on to perform other small roles in television shows and direct to video films, including American Tragedy (2002),  The Guardian (2002), Charmed (2003), 24 (2003), ER (2004), NYPD Blue (2004), and Malcolm in the Middle (2006). 

In 2006, he started becoming a regular fixture on King of the Hill. Between 2006 and the end of the show in 2009, Scott appeared in over 30 episodes, never playing the same character twice.

Filmography (motion pictures) 
 The Pursuit of Happyness (2006), Tim Brophy
 Déjà Vu, Police Lieutenant #1
 Bullethead (2002), Luane
 Mimic 2 (2001), Daryl
 American Tragedy (2000), Peter Neufeld
 Wishmaster 2: Evil Never Dies (1999), Fox
 Heavy Gear (1997), Col. Junus
 The Lottery Ticket (1997)
 The Assassination File (1996), Cop #1
 Roommates (1995), Cecilia's Son
 Striking Distance (1993), Card Player
 Money for Nothing (1993), Investment Counselor
 What She Doesn't Know (1992), Landrum
 The 10 Million Dollar Getaway (1991), John Murray

Filmography (television) 
 Bosch 2014-21, Sgt. John Mankiewicz
 Eyes 1x01 - Investigator (2007), Det. Ryan Giggs
 Navy NCIS: Naval Criminal Investigative Service 4x16 - Dead Man Walking (2007), Dr. Timothy Hass
 Boston Legal 3x14 - Selling Sickness (2007), Dr. Mitchell Levinson
 Dirt 1x06 - The Secret Lives of Altar Girls (2007), D.A. Alan Joss
 Without a Trace 5x04 - All for One (2006), Kurt Hollingsworth
 Studio 60 on the Sunset Strip 1x02 - The Cold Open (2006), Peter Goldman
 King of the Hill
 10x15 - Edu-macating Lucky (2006), Voices
 10x14 - Hank's Bully (2006), Voices
 10x12 - 24 Hour Propane People (2006), Voices
 10x10 - Hank Fixes Everything (2006), Voices
 10x08 - Business is Picking Up (2006), Voices
 10x07 - You Gotta Believe (In Moderation) (2006), Voices
 10x03 - Bill's House (2006), Mikey/Randy/Proud Father
 10x02 - Bystand Me (2005), Voices
 10x01 - Hank's on Board (2005), Voices
 9x13 - Gone with the Windstorm (2005), Voices
 9x12 - Smoking and the Bandit (2005), Voices
 9x05 - Hail to the Chief (2005), Gerald-Tax Assessor
 Invasion 2005-6 - Steve (character)

Filmography (Corporate Video) 
 ''Multiple Wendy's training videos  (early 1990s)

References

 Scott Klace at TV Guide

External links
 

1961 births
Male actors from Ohio
American male film actors
American male television actors
Living people